This is a list of the Catholic dioceses in the Philippines (Mga Katolikong diyosesis ng Pilipinas). The dioceses' bishops comprise the Catholic Bishops' Conference of the Philippines (CBCP), an episcopal conference.  The dioceses are grouped into ecclesiastical provinces, each of which comprises a Metropolitan archdiocese and several suffragan dioceses and is headed by the archbishop, as the metropolitan bishop of the province. Currently, there are 16 ecclesiastical provinces in the Philippines.

Apostolic vicariates and the military ordinariate are not part of any ecclesiastical province, but are included in the table. Like diocesan bishops, they are the ordinary responsible for spiritual care the Catholics under them and are directly subject to the Holy See. Currently, there are 7 apostolic vicariates and 1 military ordinariate in the Philippines.



List of dioceses

Gallery of archdiocesan cathedrals

See also 
 Apostolic Nunciature to the Philippines
 Catholic Church in the Philippines
 List of Catholic bishops in the Philippines
 List of Catholic dioceses (alphabetical)
 List of Catholic dioceses (structured view)
 List of Catholic archdioceses
 Catholic Church hierarchy

References

Sources and external links
 ClaretianPublications.com; Diocese
 Catholic-Hierarchy entry
 GCatholic.org

Philippines
Catholic dioceses